Makbule Abasıyanık (1883 – 22 January 1963) was a Turkish female writer and philanthropist.

Biography
Makbule Abasıyanık was born in 1883.

As the mother of the short story writer Sait Faik Abasıyanık  (1906 – 1954), she influenced him in his works. After the death of her son, Makbule Abasıyanık established the "Sait Faik Short Story Award" in 1959, and turned their residence on Burgazada, Istanbul into the Sait Faik Abasıyanık Museum the same year.

She died in Istanbul on 22 January 1963, and was interred at Zincirlikuyu Cemetery next to her son's grave.

References

1883 births
1963 deaths
20th-century Turkish women writers
Burials at Zincirlikuyu Cemetery
Museum founders
Turkish philanthropists
20th-century Turkish writers
20th-century philanthropists
20th-century women philanthropists